Since the first human spaceflight by the Soviet Union, citizens of 44 countries have flown in space. For each nationality, the launch date of the first mission is listed. The list is based on the nationality of the person at the time of the launch. Only 4 of the 44 "first flyers" have been women (Helen Sharman for the United Kingdom in 1991, Anousheh Ansari for Iran in 2006, Yi So-yeon for South Korea in 2008, and Sara Sabry for Egypt in 2022). Only three nations (Soviet Union/Russia, U.S., China) have launched their own crewed spacecraft, with the Soviets/Russians and the American programs providing rides to other nations' astronauts. Twenty-seven "first flights" occurred on Soviet or Russian flights while the United States carried sixteen.

Timeline
Note: All dates given are UTC. Countries indicated in bold have achieved independent human spaceflight capability.

Notes

Other claims
The above list uses the nationality at the time of launch. Lists with differing criteria might include the following people:
 Pavel Popovich, first launched 12 August 1962, was the first Ukrainian-born man in space.  At the time, Ukraine was a part of the Union of Soviet Socialist Republics.
 Michael Collins, first launched 18 July 1966 was born in Italy to American parents and was an American citizen when he went into space.
 William Anders, American citizen, first launched 21 December 1968, was the first Hong Kong-born man in space.
 Vladimir Shatalov, first launched 14 January 1969, was the first Kazakh-born man in space. At the time, Kazakhstan was a part of the Union of Soviet Socialist Republics.
 Bill Pogue, first launched 16 November 1973, as an inductee to the 5 Civilized Tribes Hall of Fame can lay claim to being the first Native American in space.  See John Herrington below regarding technicality of tribal registration.
 Pyotr Klimuk, first launched 18 December 1973, was the first Belorussian-born man in space. At the time, Belarus was a part of the Union of Soviet Socialist Republics.
 Vladimir Dzhanibekov, first launched 16 March 1978, was the first Uzbek-born man in space. At the time, Uzbekistan was a part of the Union of Soviet Socialist Republics.
 Paul D. Scully-Power, first launched 5 October 1984, was born in Australia, but was an American citizen when he went into space; Australian law at the time forbade dual-citizenship.
 Taylor Gun-Jin Wang, first launched 29 April 1985, was born in China to Chinese parents, but was an American citizen when he went into space.
 Lodewijk van den Berg, launched 29 April 1985, was born in the Netherlands, but was an American citizen when he went into space.
 Patrick Baudry, first launched 17 June 1985, was born in French Cameroun (now part of Cameroon), but was a French citizen when he went into space.
 Shannon Lucid, first launched 17 June 1985, was born in China to American parents of European descent, and was an American citizen when she went into space.
 Franklin Chang-Diaz, first launched 12 January 1986, was born in Costa Rica, but was an American citizen when he went into space
 Musa Manarov, first launched 21 December 1987, was the first Azerbaijan-born man in space. At the time, Azerbaijan was a part of the Union of Soviet Socialist Republics.
 Anatoly Solovyev, first launched 7 June 1988, was the first Latvian-born man in space. At the time, Latvia was a part of the Union of Soviet Socialist Republics.
 Sergei Konstantinovich Krikalev and Aleksandr Aleksandrovich Volkov became Russian rather than Soviet citizens while still in orbit aboard Mir, making them the first purely Russian citizens in space.
 James H. Newman, American citizen, first launched 12 September 1993, was born in the portion of the United Nations Trust Territory of the Pacific Islands that is now the Federated States of Micronesia.
 Talgat Musabayev, first launched 1 July 1994, was born in the Kazakh SSR and is known in Kazakhstan as the "first cosmonaut of independent Kazakhstan", but was a Russian citizen when he went into space.
 Frederick W. Leslie, American citizen, launched 20 October 1995, was born in Panama Canal Zone (now Panama).
 Andy Thomas, first launched 19 May 1996, was born in Australia but like Paul D. Scully-Power was an American citizen when he went to space; Australian law at the time forbade dual-citizenship.
 Carlos I. Noriega, first launched 15 May 1997, was born in Peru, but was an American citizen when he went into space.
 Bjarni Tryggvason, launched 7 August 1997, was born in Iceland, but was a Canadian citizen when he went into space.
 Salizhan Sharipov, first launched 22 January 1998, was born in Kyrgyzstan (then the Kirghiz SSR), but was a Russian citizen when he went into space. Sharipov is of Uzbek ancestry.
 Philippe Perrin, first launched 5 June 2002, was born in Morocco, but was a French citizen when he went into space.
 John Herrington, an American citizen first launched 24 November 2002, is the first tribal registered Native American in space (Chickasaw).  See also Bill Pogue above.
 Fyodor Yurchikhin, first launched 7 October 2002, was born in Georgia (then the Georgian SSR). He was a Russian citizen at the time he went into space and is of Pontian Greek descent.
 Joseph M. Acaba, first launched 15 March 2009, was born in the U.S. state of California to American parents of Puerto Rican descent.

Gallery

References

External links
Current Space Demographics, compiled by William Harwood, CBS News Space Consultant, and Rob Navias, NASA.

Lists of firsts in space
Spaceflight timelines